Martin Hoppe "Marty" Baccaglio (born September 28, 1944) is a former American football defensive end. He played college football at San José State University and in high school at Novato High School. He played professionally in the American Football League for the San Diego Chargers in 1968 and for the Cincinnati Bengals from 1968 to 1970.

See also
List of American Football League players

References

1944 births
Living people
Players of American football from San Francisco
American football defensive ends
San Jose State Spartans football players
San Diego Chargers players
Cincinnati Bengals players
American Football League players